Got Live If You Want It! (stylized on the front cover as got LIVE if you want it!) is a six-song extended play (EP) release by the Rolling Stones featuring live recordings from 1965. The title is a pun on the swamp blues song "I Got Love If You Want It" by Slim Harpo; the Stones recorded his "I'm a King Bee" for their 1964 debut album. Got Live If You Want It! reached number one in the UK and was the group's last EP.

Although not issued in the US, three of its songs were included on albums released there by London Records in 1965: "I'm Alright" on Out of Our Heads; and "Route 66" and "I'm Moving On" on December's Children (And Everybody's). With different tracks mostly recorded in 1966, London used the title for a live album released in December 1966.

Recording

Renowned for its raw-sounding quality, Got Live If You Want It! has endured as a live artifact, more for its historical than musical appeal. Reportedly engineer Glyn Johns had hung microphones over the balcony for the recording; however, this is called into question as "I'm Alright" on the Got Live If You Want It! LP (recorded and released a year later) contains the same backing track but with different vocals. This would have been impossible if the recordings were made as described. Additionally, "I'm Moving On" features (at the very least) a harmonica overdub as the instrument can be heard underneath Jagger's vocal during the first verse while Brian Jones (the group's other harmonica player) is playing slide guitar. These two tracks may even be studio recordings re-tooled to give the impression of being live. The lack of studio documentation relating to The Stones' Decca recordings makes this difficult to confirm, but this approach was used the following year on the US Got Live If You Want It! LP.

Release and reception

In a review for AllMusic, Richie Unterberger gave the EP three out of five stars. He noted, "The EP was crudely recorded, but the raw energy of the group's early performances does shine through, particularly on the two best tracks, the cover of Hank Snow's 'I'm Moving On', and [Bo Diddley's] 'I'm Alright'."

Unavailable for decades, Got Live If You Want It! was reissued on CD in 2004 on the Singles 1963–1965 box set. In November 2010, it was made available digitally and in 2011 as part of the 60's UK EP Collection digital compilation. On 29 November 2013, the EP was reissued on 7-inch vinyl record as a part of Record Store Day Black Friday 2013.

Track listing

Personnel
The Rolling Stones
Mick Jagger – lead vocals, harmonica, percussion
Keith Richards – guitars, backing vocals
Brian Jones – guitars, backing vocals
Bill Wyman – bass guitar, backing vocals
Charlie Watts – drums

Chart positions

References 

1965 EPs
Albums produced by Andrew Loog Oldham
Live EPs
The Rolling Stones EPs
1965 live albums
Decca Records live albums
Decca Records EPs
The Rolling Stones live albums